The 2016–17 LSU Tigers basketball team represented Louisiana State University during the 2016–17 NCAA Division I men's basketball season. The team's head coach was Johnny Jones, who was in his fifth season at LSU. They played their home games at the Pete Maravich Assembly Center in Baton Rouge, Louisiana, as a member of the Southeastern Conference. They finished the season 10–21, 2–16 in SEC play to finish in a tie for 13th place. They lost in the First Round of the SEC tournament to Mississippi State.

On March 10, head coach Johnny Jones was fired. He finished at LSU with a five-year record of 90–72. On March 20, LSU hired VCU head coach Will Wade as their next head coach.

Previous season
The LSU Tigers finished the season 19–14, 11–7 in SEC play to finish in a three-way tie for third place. They defeated Tennessee in the quarterfinals of the 2016 SEC tournament to advance to the semifinals where they lost to Texas A&M. On March 13, the day after losing to Texas A&M by 33 points, they announced they would not participate in a postseason tournament.

Offseason

Departures

Incoming transfers

Class of 2016 signees

Class of 2017 signees

Roster

Schedule and results

|-
!colspan=12 style="background:#461D7C; color:white;"| Exhibition

|-
!colspan=12 style=|Regular season

|-
!colspan=12 style=| SEC Tournament

Source:

See also
 2016–17 LSU Lady Tigers basketball team

References

LSU Tigers basketball seasons
Lsu
LSU
LSU